Anthony Ralston (born 16 November 1998) is a Scottish professional footballer who plays as a right-back for Scottish Premiership club Celtic and the Scotland national football team.

Club career
Part of the youth system at Celtic since the age of eight, Ralston made his debut for the first team on 11 May 2016, in a 2–1 defeat against St Johnstone. He scored his first goal for the club in a 5–0 Scottish League Cup win over Kilmarnock on 8 August 2017. He made further appearances early in the 2017–18 season, including a UEFA Champions League match against Paris Saint-Germain, but then suffered a knee injury in late September. Ralston signed a long-term contract with Celtic in December 2017, with the deal due to run until the end of the 2021–22 season.

On 16 March 2018, Ralston joined Dundee United on an emergency loan until the end of the 2017–18 season, a side challenging for promotion from the Championship up to the Premiership. He made his debut on 20 March, in a 3–2 loss in the league to Queen of the South. In 15 appearances, he helped United reach the semi-final play-off for promotion, scoring two goals, albeit the side lost to Livingston in the semi-final play-off.

On 2 September 2019, Ralston moved to St Johnstone on a season-long loan.

Upon his return from the St Johnstone loan, Ralston played in only one game for Celtic during the following season, coming in a 0–0 draw against Livingston when several squad regulars were missing due to a Covid-19 isolation issue, and when centre-half Kristoffer Ajer then loanee Jonjoe Kenny were selected at right-back ahead of him following the sale of Jeremie Frimpong, it appeared his time with the club would be coming to an end.

At the start of the 2021–22 season under new manager Ange Postecoglou, Ralston signed a contract extension until May 2022 and started in both legs against FC Midtjylland in the UEFA Champions League second qualifying round. Media outlets praised his performances in the early part of the season, following goals against Hearts and Dundee. On 2 November 2021, he signed a new long-term contract with Celtic, keeping him at the club until 2025.

On 15 December 2021, Ralston headed in a 97th minute winner against Ross County in a dramatic 1-2 away victory for a Celtic side that was reduced to 10-men at Victoria Park. This sealed a result which kept Celtic within touching distance of Rangers in the Scottish Premiership, who were only four points above Celtic in the league table at that time. It has been looked back on as one of the most important moments in Celtic going on to win the 2021-22 Scottish Premiership title.

International career
Ralston was involved with several Scotland youth squads up to the under-21s. 

Selected for the Scotland under-20 squad in the 2017 Toulon Tournament, Ralston played as Scotland beat Brazil under-20s 1–0, which was the nations first ever win against Brazil at any level. The team went on to claim the bronze medal. It was the nations first ever medal at the competition. Selected for the under-21 squad in the 2018 Toulon Tournament. They lost to Turkey under-21s in a penalty-out and finished fourth.

In November 2021 he was called up to the senior squad for the first time ahead of a 2022 World Cup qualifier against Denmark, as a replacement for the suspended Nathan Patterson. He made his international debut in the match as a late substitute for Kieran Tierney. On his second Scotland appearance he scored his first international goal during a Nations League group match against Armenia, assisted by Stuart Armstrong.

Career statistics

Club

International

Scores and results list Scotland's goal tally first, score column indicates score after each Ralston goal.

Honours
Celtic
Scottish Premiership: 2021–22
Scottish League Cup: 2021–22, 2022–23

References

External links
 
 

1998 births
Living people
Footballers from Bellshill
Scottish footballers
Association football defenders
Scotland international footballers
Scotland under-21 international footballers
Scotland youth international footballers
Scottish Professional Football League players
Celtic F.C. players
Dundee United F.C. players
Queen's Park F.C. players
St Johnstone F.C. players